Libertad station (also known as Antonio Arnaiz station or simply Arnaiz station) is an elevated Manila Light Rail Transit (LRT) station situated on Line 1. The station is located in Pasay at the corner of Taft Avenue and Arnaiz Avenue. The station is named after the former Libertad (Spanish for "liberty") Street, which is a junction of both Roxas Boulevard and Taft Avenue in Pasay. The name Libertad survives as an area name, nowadays, after Libertad Street became a part of Antonio Arnaiz Avenue.

Libertad station is the third station for trains headed to Roosevelt, the eighteenth station for trains headed to Baclaran, and is one of the four stations serving Pasay, the others are Gil Puyat, EDSA, and Baclaran.

Transportation links 
There are bus terminals for some bus lines near the station, while jeepneys, taxis, and tricycles stop at and around the station entrance. However, buses also stop near the station, for those riding buses that do not stop at the nearby bus terminals. Jeepneys that leave adjacent to the station head along Arnaiz Avenue for various parts of Caloocan, Makati, Manila, and Pasay.

Gallery

See also
List of rail transit stations in Metro Manila
Manila Light Rail Transit System

References

Manila Light Rail Transit System stations
Railway stations opened in 1984
Buildings and structures in Pasay